Maluku is a province of Indonesia. It comprises the central and southern regions of the Maluku Islands. The main city and capital of Maluku province is Ambon on the small Ambon Island. The land area is 46,150.92 km2, and the total population of this province at the 2010 census was 1,533,506 people, rising to 1,848,923 at the 2020 census. The official estimate as at mid 2022 was 1,881,727. Maluku is located in Eastern Indonesia. It is directly adjacent to North Maluku, Southwest Papua, and West Papua in the north, Central Sulawesi, and Southeast Sulawesi in the west, Banda Sea, East Timor and East Nusa Tenggara in the south and Arafura Sea, Central Papua and South Papua in the east.

Maluku has two main religions, namely Islam which at the 2020 census was adhered to by 52.85% of the population of the province and Christianity which is embraced by 46.3% (39.4% Protestantism and 7.0% Catholicism).

All the Maluku Islands were part of a single province from 1950 until 1999. In 1999, the northern part of Maluku (then comprising the Maluku Utara Regency, the Halmahera Tengah Regency and the City of Ternate) were split off to form a separate province of North Maluku.

Etymology 
Historically, the term Maluku referred to the four royal centers in North Maluku, namely Ternate, Tidore, Bacan and Jailolo. A type of confederation consisting of the four kingdoms, which most likely emerged in the 14th century, was called Moloku Kie Raha or "The Four Mountains of Maluku". Although the four kingdoms subsequently expanded and covered the entire North Maluku region (as now defined) and parts of Sulawesi and New Guinea, the area of expansion was originally not included in the term Maluku. This only referred to the four main clove-producing islands to the west of Halmahera: Ternate, Tidore. Moti and Makian. Bacan further to the south, and Jailolo on Halmahera, were also commonly included in Maluku Proper, the four kingdoms forming a ritual quadripartition with connotations to local cosmology.

The etymology of the word Maluku is not very clear, and it has been a matter of debate for many experts. The first recorded word that can be identified with Maluku comes from Nagarakretagama, an Old Javanese eulogy of 1365. Canto 14 stanza 5 mentioned Maloko, which Pigeaud identified with Ternate or Moluccas. A theory holds that the name Maluku comes from the concept of "Maluku Kie Raha". "Raha" means four, while "kie" here means mountain, referring to 4 mountains of Ternate, Tidore, Bacan, and Jailolo (Halmahera), which have their own kolano (title for local kings). Therefore, the Maluku can come from: "Moloku" here meaning to grasp or hold. In this context, the meaning of "Moloku Kie Raha" is "the confederation of four mountains". However, the root word "loku" comes from local Malay creole word for a unit, therefore not from an indigenous language. The other possibility is that the word "Maloko" is a combination of "Ma", meaning "support" and "Loko" referring to the area. The phrase "Maloko Kie Raha" means "the place/world which has four mountains".

History

Pre-colonial era 

The region was first settled by Melanesians at least 40,000 years ago, collectively now known as the Alifuru tribes.These people are the indigenous inhabitants of Maluku, along with the later Austronesian migration.

At the beginning of the 14th century the Majapahit Kingdom ruled maritime Southeast Asia. At that time, traders from Java monopolized the spice trade in Maluku.

During the Ming dynasty, spices from Maluku were introduced in various works of art and history. In a painting by W.P. Groeneveldt, titled Gunung Dupa, Maluku, is described as a green mountainous region filled with cloves – an oasis in the middle of the southeastern sea. Marco Polo also described the clove trade in Maluku during his visit to Sumatra.

Colonial era 
The first Europeans to arrive in Maluku were the Portuguese, in 1512. At that time two Portuguese fleets, under the leadership of António de Abreu and Francisco Serrão, landed in the Banda Islands and the Penyu Islands. After they established relations with local residents and kings, such as the Sultanate of Ternate on the island of Ternate, the Portuguese were given permission to build fortifications in Pikaoli, as well as the old Hitu State, and Mamala on Ambon Island. The Portuguese gained a monopoly while at the same time carrying out the spread of Catholicism.

One of the famous missionaries was Francis Xavier. Arriving in Ambon on February 14, 1546, then traveling to Ternate, arriving in 1547, visiting islands in the Maluku Islands to spread Catholicism.

The relationship between the Portuguese and Ternatean broke down in 1570, resulting in a war with Sultan Babullah that lasted for 5 years (1570–1575), causing the Portuguese to be expelled from Ternate and were driven to Tidore and Ambon.

The resistance of the Moluccas to the Portuguese was used by the Dutch to gain a foothold in Maluku. In 1605, the Dutch managed to force the Portuguese to surrender their defenses in Ambon to Steven van der Hagen and at Tidore to the Sebastiansz Cornelisz. Similarly, the British fortress in Kambelo, Seram Island, was destroyed by the Dutch. Giving the Dutch control of most of the Maluku region.

The Dutch position in Maluku grew stronger with the establishment of the Dutch East India Company (VOC) in 1602, and since then the Netherlands has become the sole ruler in Maluku. Under the leadership of Jan Pieterszoon Coen, Chief of Operations of the VOC, the clove trade in Maluku was under VOC control for almost 350 years. For this purpose, the VOC did not hesitate to expel the Portuguese, Spanish and the British. Tens of thousands of Moluccans were victims of VOC brutality.

During the Napoleonic Wars, British forces captured Maluku as the Netherlands were under French occupation. After the Anglo-Dutch Treaty of 1814, the British returned Maluku to the Dutch. The Dutch returned in 1817.

The return of the Dutch in 1817 evoked strong resistance from the Moluccans. This was due to political, economic and social relations conditions that had been bad for two centuries. Moluccan people of the Ambon Islands rose up and took up arms under the leadership of Thomas Matulessy who was given the title Kapitan Pattimura, a former major sergeant of the British army.

On May 15, 1817, an attack was launched against Fort Duurstede on Saparua island, resulting in the death of Resident Johannes Rudolph van den Berg and his family. Pattimura was assisted by Philip Latumahina, Anthony Ribok, and Said Orders.

The news of this Pattimura's victory aroused the spirit of popular resistance throughout Maluku. Paulus Tiahahu and his daughter Martha Christina Tiahahu fought the Dutch on Nusa Laut, and Kapitan Ulupaha in Ambon.

But this resistance was crushed by the Dutch, being heavily outnumbered. On December 16, 1817, Pattimura and his colleagues were sentenced to death on the gallows, at Fort Niew Victoria, Ambon, while Martha Christina Tiahahu died on the boat during her voyage to Java and her body was released into the Banda Sea.

Modern era 
During the outbreak of the Pacific War on December 7, 1941, as part of World War II the region was occupied by the Japanese. Governor General A.W.L. Tjarda van Starkenborgh via radio stated that the Dutch East Indies government was in a state of war with the Empire of Japan. The Imperial Japanese Army did not encounter much resistance in Maluku. Japanese forces entered from the north through the island of Morotai and from the east through the island of Misool. In a short time the entire Maluku Islands was occupied by Japan. In World War II, Australian forces had fought against the Japanese in Tawiri. And, to commemorate it, an Australian monument was built in Tawiri (not far from Pattimura Airport). Allied forces surrendered to the Japanese in Ambon after the bloody Battle of Ambon, The battle was followed by the summary execution of more than 300 Allied PoWs in the Laha massacre.

On August 15, 1945, Japan capitulated to the Allied forces. Two days later, the Proclamation of Independence of Indonesia was declared. Maluku was declared as one of the provinces of the Republic of Indonesia. However, the formation and position of Maluku was forced to take place in Jakarta, as after the Japanese surrender, the Netherlands Indies Civil Administration (NICA) immediately re-entered Maluku to assume control. The Dutch controlled Maluku until 1949, when in accordance to the Dutch–Indonesian Round Table Conference, the Dutch recognize sovereignty of Indonesia. The Dutch soon left Maluku. Due to a deep distrust of the Indonesian leadership, which was predominantly Javanese Muslim, in 1951 an independent Republic of the South Moluccas (Indonesian: RMS, Republik Maluku Selatan) was proclaimed at Ambon. The RMS had strong support among the former Moluccans colonial soldiers. Indonesian forces invaded Maluku to crush the separatists. The main stronghold of the RMS on Ambon was defeated by Indonesian forces in November 1950, while a smaller scale guerilla struggle continued on Seram Island until 1962. The defeat on Ambon however resulted in the flight of the self-declared RMS government from the islands, and the formation of a government in exile in the Netherlands. The following year some 12,000 Moluccan soldiers accompanied by their families went to the Netherlands.

In April and May 1958 during the Permesta rebellion in North Sulawesi, the USA supported and supplied the rebels. Pilots from a Taiwan-based CIA front organisation, Civil Air Transport, flying CIA B-26 Invader aircraft, repeatedly raided targets on Ambon. From April 27 until 18 May there were CIA air raids on Ambon city. On May 8, 1958, CIA pilot Allen Pope raided the Indonesian Air Force base at Liang in the northeast of the island, damaging the runway and destroying a Consolidated PBY Catalina. The Indonesian Air Force had only one serviceable fighter aircraft on Ambon Island, a North American P-51 Mustang at Liang. Pope's last air raid was on 18 May, when an Indonesian pilot at Liang, Captain Ignatius Dewanto, was scrambled to the P-51. Pope had attacked Ambon city before Dewanto could catch him, but Dewanto intercepted him just as Pope was attacking a pair of troop ships in an Indonesian fleet west of Ambon Island. The B-26 was brought down by fire from both Dewanto and anti-aircraft gunners on board the ship. Pope and his Indonesian radio operator bailed and were captured, which immediately exposed the level of CIA support for the Permesta rebellion. Embarrassed, the Eisenhower administration quickly ended CIA support for Permesta and withdrew its agents and remaining aircraft from the conflict.

The Maluku sectarian conflict broke out across Maluku in January 1999. The subsequent 18 months were characterized by fighting between largely local groups of Muslims and Christians, the destruction of thousands of houses, the displacement of approximately 500,000 people, the loss of thousands of lives, and the segregation of Muslims and Christians. Inter-communal fighting broke out between Christian and Muslim communities in January 1999, cascading into what could be described as all out warfare and atrocities against the civilian population committed by both sides. The main belligerents were therefore religious militia from both faiths, including the well organised Islamist Laskar Jihad, and Indonesian government military forces. The conflict had a significant effect upon the 2.1 million people of greater Maluku. Leading up to the Malino agreement, the International Crisis Group estimated that 700,000 people had been displaced by the four years of fighting in the Moluccas which is thought to have claimed a minimum of 5,000 lives. This constituted the largest movement of refugees since the federation of the Indonesian state and the majority of the 1.4 million Internal refugees reported in February 2002 by the World Food Programme. The duration of the conflict is generally dated from the start of the Reformasi era in early 1999 to the signing of the Malino II Accord on February 13, 2002.

Geography
Maluku is bordered by North Maluku in the north, West Papua in the East, Southeast Sulawesi and Central Sulawesi in the West, and the nation of Timor-Leste and Australia in the south. While the total area consists of 527,191 km2 of sea area, and 54,185 km2 of land area, or in other words around 90% of Maluku is sea area. As an archipelago province, Maluku has 559 islands, which include some relatively large islands: Seram (18,625 km2), Buru (9,000 km2) Yamdena (5,085 km2) and Wetar (3,624 km2). With the dominant condition of regional waters, Maluku is very open to interacting with other provinces and surrounding countries.

Maluku islands have a tropical monsoon climate, this climate is greatly influenced by the presence of vast marine waters and takes place in tune with the climatic season there. The average temperature based on Meteorological stations in Ambon, Tual and Saumlaki are C 26.80, 27.70 C and 27.40 C. Minimum temperatures are 24.00, 24.70 C and 23.80 C, respectively, while the temperature Tual, the average humidity reaches 85.4% when recording Saumlaki Meteorological Station shows the average humidity is 80.2%.

The topography of the average condition of the Ambon region is rather flat, starting from the coast to residential areas. The mainland morphology of Ambon also varies from flat, bumpy, bumpy, hilly and mountainous with soft steep slopes to slightly dominant. The flat area has a slope of 0–3%, corrugated slope 3–8%, corrugated area 8–15%, hilly area 15–30% slope elevation and mountainous area greater than 30%. As for the Central Maluku Regency, West Seram and East Seram, the topography is generally hilly. 0–2%, tilt / wavy 3–15% rather steep 15–40% and very steep 40%.

Topography in the Southeast Maluku Regency is divided into plains, hills and mountains with flat slopes (0–3%), flat / bumpy (0–3%), bumpy (8–15%), rather steep (15–30%) and very steep (> 50%). The height of the sea surface area is divided into three classes, namely in the low altitude area (000–100 m elevation), middle (100–500 m), and high altitude (> 500 m).

The topography of Buru Regency is mostly hilly and mountainous with a slope of 15–40% and 40%, the remaining height is from ordinary varieties. The highest mountain peak is located in the Kapalamada region north west of Buru with an altitude of 2736 meters above sea level (ASL), after Lake Rana with a height of more than 1000 meters above sea level, Lake Rana is estimated at around 700–750 meters above sea level. Using a landscape approach, Buru district is classified above, the coastal hills of the plains and mountains include varieties of highlands and slopes.

List of major islands in Maluku 

Ambon Island
Aru Islands (Kepulauan Aru)
Babar Islands
Banda Islands (Kepulauan Banda)
Buru
Damer Island (Kepulauan Damar)
Kai Islands (Kepulauan Kai)
Gorong archipelago (Pulau-pulau Gorong)
Lease Islands (Kepulauan Lease) includes Saparua, Nusa Laut and Haruku Islands
Leti Islands (Kepulauan Leti) includes Leti, Moa and Lakor
Seram
Sermata Islands (Kepulauan Sermata)
 Southwestern Islands (Barat Daya Islands) includes Wetar Island, Kisar Island and Romang Island
Tanimbar Islands (Kepulauan Tanimbar)
Watubela archipelago (Kepulauan Watubela)
Wetar

Administrative divisions
Following the splitting off of the northern parts of the regency in 1999 to form the new North Maluku Province (Maluku Utara), the residual province of Maluku was composed of two regencies (Central Maluku and Southeast Maluku) and the City of Ambon, but on 4 October 1999 two new regencies were created with the separation of Buru Regency from Central Maluku, and of Southeast Maluku West Regency from Southeast Maluku. Three additional regencies were created on 18 December 2003 (under Law 40/2003) - East Seram Regency and West Seram Regency, both from parts of Central Maluku, and Aru Islands Regency from part of Southeast Maluku (which was thus left to comprise just the Kai Islands. On 17 July 2007 the City of Tual was separated from Southeast Maluku, and on 24 June 2008 two further regencies were created - South Buru Regency from part of Buru, and Southwest Maluku Regency from part of Southeast Maluku West. The residual part of Southeast Maluku West Regency was subsequently renamed  the Tanimbar Islands Regency on 23 January 2019.

Thus the province of Maluku is currently divided into nine regencies (kabupaten) and the two cities (kota) of Ambon and Tual, which form the tenth and eleventh regency-level administrative divisions. The regencies and cities, with their administrative capitals, are listed below with their areas and their populations at the 2010 census and at the 2020 census, together with the official estimates for mid 2022. The toble also includes the numbers of districts (kecamata) and villages (urban kelurahan and rural desa) in each city or regency.

Demographics

Ethnicity 
Maluku are dominated by the Moluccans, which are part of the Melanesian ethnic race related to the people in New Guinea as well as other countries such as Fiji, Vanuatu, Solomon Islands, and several island nations scattered in the Pacific Ocean.

There is a lot of strong evidence that refers to Maluku having traditional ties with the Pacific island nations, such as language, folk songs, food, as well as equipment for household appliances and typical musical instruments, for example: Ukulele (which is also found in the Hawaiian cultural tradition).

They generally have dark skin, curly hair, large and strong bones, and a more athletic body profile compared to other groups in Indonesia, because they are a group of islanders where sea activities such as sailing and swimming are the main activities for men.

Since ancient times, many of them already had mixed blood with other ethnic groups, namely with Europeans (generally the Netherlands, Portugal) and Spain, then the Arabs were very common considering this area had been controlled by foreign nations for 2,300 years and gave birth to new descendants, which is no longer a pure Melanesian race but still inherits and lives with the Melanesian-Alifuru style.

Because of this mixture of culture and race with Europeans and Arabs, Maluku is the only Indonesian territory that is classified as an area that has the largest multiracial population other than East Nusa Tenggara. Many Moluccans still retained foreign surnames from foreign countries such as the Netherlands (Van Afflen, Van Room, De Wanna, De Kock, Kniesmeijer, Gaspersz, Ramschie, Payer, Ziljstra, Van der Weden, etc.), Portugal (Da Costa, De Fretes, Que, Carliano, De Souza, De Carvalho, Pareira, Courbois, Frandescolli, etc.), Spain (Oliviera, Diaz, De Jesus, Silvera, Rodriguez, Montefalcon, Mendoza, De Lopez, etc.) and Arabic directly from Hadramaut (Al-Kaff, Al Chatib, Bachmid, Bakhwereez, Bahasoan, Al-Qadri, Alaydrus, Assegaff, etc.)

Today, the people of Maluku are not only found in Indonesia but are spread in various countries in the world. Most of those who migrate abroad are due to various reasons, of which the most classic was the large-scale movement of the Moluccans to Europe in the 1950s and settled there until now. Another reason is to get a better, more knowledgeable life, marrying and marrying other nations, who later settle down and have generations of new Moluccas in the other hemisphere. These Maluku expatriates can be found in quite large communities and are concentrated in several countries such as the Netherlands (which is considered the second homeland by the Moluccas other than the land of Maluku itself), Suriname, and Australia. The Maluku community in other regions of Indonesia can be found in Medan, Palembang, Bandung, Greater Jakarta, Central Java, Yogyakarta, East Java, Makassar, Kupang, Manado, East Kalimantan, Sorong, and Jayapura.

Language 
The languages used in Maluku, especially in Ambon, has been influenced by foreign languages, often by explorers who have visited and even occupied and colonized Maluku in the past. The nations were the Spanish, Portuguese, Arabic and Dutch.

The Ambonese language, as the lingua franca in Maluku, has been understood by almost all residents of Maluku Province and generally, little by little, is understood by other East Indonesian people such as those in Ternate, Manado, Kupang, etc. because Ambonese is related to other languages in the provinces of North Sulawesi, North Maluku, Papua, West Papua, and East Nusa Tenggara.

Indonesian, as the official language and language of unity in the Unitary State of the Republic of Indonesia (NKRI), is used in official and formal public activities such as in government offices and in schools and in places such as museums, airports and ports.

Maluku is the largest archipelago in all of Indonesia, although this area is 90% water and only 10% land. Maluku Province and North Maluku Province together compose the Maluku Islands. The large number of islands that are separated by long distances from each other also results in the increasingly diverse languages used in this province. Some of the most common languages spoken in Maluku - apart from Ambonese and Indonesian - are:

 Wemale language, used by residents of Piru, Seruawan, Kamarian, and Rumberu in the West Seram Regency.
 Alune language is used in three water streams, namely Tala, Mala and Malewa in the West Seram Regency area.
 Nuaulu language, spoken by the Nuaulu tribe in the south of Seram Island, is between Elpaputi Bay and Teluk Teluti.
 Atiahu language, used by three ethnic groups, which also included the Nuaulu family, namely Atiahu, Werinama, and Batuasa in the East Seram Regency.
 Seti language is spoken by the Seti people, in North Seram and East Teluti, and also as a trade language in Eastern Seram.
 Tarangan language, spoken in the Aru Island region.

Religion 

Most of the people of Maluku adheres to either Islam, (52.85% of the population) or Christianity (46.3% of the population); the latter are divided between followers of (Protestantism (39.39%) and Catholicism (6.87%). There are also adherents of folk religion, Hinduism and Buddhism. The spread of Islam was carried out by the Sultanates of Iha, Saulau, Hitu, and Hatuhaha and Arab traders who visited Maluku. While the spread of Christianity was carried out by missionaries from Portugal, Spain and the Netherlands.

Places of worship in Maluku Province in 2013 were recorded as follows:

 2,345 churches
 2,000 mosques
 10 temples
 5 Vihara

The Protestant Church of Maluku (Gereja Protestan Maluku or simply GPM) is the largest synod organization and church organization in Maluku, which has church congregations in almost the entire Sarane country throughout Maluku.

Economy
Macroeconomically, Maluku's economic conditions tend to improve every year. One indicator is, among others, an increase in the value of GDP. In 2003 Maluku's GRDP reached 3.7 trillion rupiah and then increased to 4.05 trillion in 2004. Economic growth in 2004 reached 4.05 percent and increased to 5.06 percent in 2005.

The geographical condition of Maluku Province when viewed from the strategic side of business investment opportunities can be predicted that natural resources in the fisheries and marine sector can be used as prima donna businesses in Maluku, in addition to other sectors such as livestock and plantation subsector, trade sector and tourism sector as well as the service sector entirely has a high selling value and business potential.

Currently the economy of Maluku is dominated by agriculture, forestry and fisheries that contribute to about 25.00 percent of the total.
Government service sector, defence and compulsory Social Security contribute to roughly 21 percent. The business field and retail trade; cars and motorcycles repair & services at 12.59 percent; construction sector contributes 7.41 percent.
Maluku's economy in 2014 has shown positive improvement as compared to 2013. The GDP growth rate in 2014 reached 6.70 percent, while in 2013 amounted to 5.26 percent. The highest economic growth is in the field of electricity and gas supply business which grew by 31.11 percent. The business service is another sector that experienced positive growth in 2014.
Other economic activities also recorded positive growth, including mining and quarrying (21.47 percent); education services business field (9.52 percent); transportation and warehousing business sector (8.77 percent); processing industry (8.42 percent); information and communication (7.62 per cent); financial services business (7.61 percent); construction (7.31 percent); real estate (7.10 percent).

In 2017, a Japanese oil company, Inpex Corporation acquired Abadi Field, a crude oil and natural gas field located in the Arafura Sea, near Tanimbar Islands. In 2017 the company to start the Pre FEED phase and hold a joint workshop with SKK Migas to prepare an offshore development plan for project of Block Masela.

Culture

Music 
The famous musical instruments are Tifa (a type of drum) and Totobuang, played together in an ensemble called a Tifa totobuang. Each musical instrument from Tifa to Totobuang has different functions and supports each other to give birth to a very distinctive color of music. But this music is dominated by Tifa musical instruments. It consists of Tifa, Tifa Jekir, Tifa Dasar, Tifa Potong, Tifa Jekir Potong and Tifa Bas, plus a large Gong and Toto Buang which is a series of small gongs placed on a table with several holes as a buffer. There is also a wind instrument namely Bia Skin (Shellfish).

In the culture of Maluku, there are also stringed instruments namely Ukulele and that can also be found in the Hawaiian culture in the United States. This can be seen when Maluku music from the past until now still has a characteristic in which there is the use of Hawaiian musical instruments both in pop songs and in accompanying traditional dances such as Katreji.

Other musical instruments is the Sawat. Sawat is a blend of Maluku culture and Middle Eastern culture. In a few centuries ago, the Arabs came to spread Islam in Maluku, then there was a mixture of cultures including music. It is evident in several Sawat musical instruments, such as Tambourines and Flutes that characterize Arabian music instruments.

Outside of the variety of musical instruments, Moluccan people are famous for being good at singing. Since long ago they have often sung in accompanying traditional dances. There are many famous Moluccan singers in both Indonesia and the Netherlands, such as Broery Pesulima, Daniel Sahuleka, Ruth Sahanaya, Eric Papilaya, Glen Fredly, etc.

Dance 
The famous dance from the Moluccas is the Cakalele which describes the might of the Moluccas. This dance is usually performed by adult men while holding Parang and Salawaku (Shield).

There are also other dances like Saureka-Reka that use the sago palm fronds. The dances performed by six women really need accuracy and speed while accompanied by a very interesting musical rhythm.

The dance which is a depiction of youth association is Katreji. Katreji dance is played in pairs between women and men with varied energetic and interesting movements. This dance is almost the same as European dances in general because Katreji is also an acculturation of European (Portuguese and Dutch) culture with Maluku culture. This is more evident in every signal in changing floor patterns and movements which still use Portuguese and Dutch as a process of bilingualism. This dance is accompanied by a violin instrument, bamboo flute, ukulele, karakas, guitar, tifa, and bass guitar with a more prominent western (European) musical pattern. This dance is still performed by the people of Maluku until now.

In addition to Katreji, the famous European influence is Polonaise, which is usually carried out by Moluccans at the time of marriage by each party member in pairs, forming a circle formation and carrying out light movements that can be followed by everyone, both young and old.

In addition, there is also a Crazy Bamboo Dance. Crazy bamboo dance is a special dance that is magical, originating from Suli Village. The uniqueness of this dance is that the dancers are burdened by bamboo which can move uncontrollably and this dance can be followed by anyone.

Tourism 
Some of the famous tourist attractions in Maluku include:

 Manusela National Park
 Pasir Panjang Beach
 Natsepa Beach, Ambon
 City Gate, Ambon

See also
 Districts of Maluku
 List of islands of Indonesia
 List of Maluku governors
 List of rivers of Maluku (province)
 Baileo

References

Bibliography

 

 
Provinces of Indonesia
.